The General San Martín Cultural Centre is a cultural centre located in Buenos Aires, Argentina near the major thoroughfare Corrientes Avenue.

It is run by the city government, and hosts diverse cultural and artistic events. Adjacent to the theatre of the same name inaugurated in 1960 on Corrientes Avenue, the cultural center was designed by local architect Mario Roberto Álvarez, and was built between 1962 and 1970.

The center hosted the National Commission on the Disappeared (CONADEP) in 1984, as well as the first session of the Buenos Aires City Legislature following the devolution of autonomy to the city in 1996, and an extensive renovation began in 2007. Its annual theatre audiences of nearly 350,000 make it the largest public cultural center nationally, and with similar numbers at the privately operated Paseo La Plaza one block west, the 1500 block of Corrientes Avenue is arguably the leading center for the theatre in Latin America.

The cultural centre is named after General José de San Martín, leader of the Argentine War of Independence.

The  building is spread over 12 floors and has different rooms for workshops and courses, including the Buenos Aires Audiovisual Nucleus with over 7,000 documentary works. The principal halls are: 
Sala Ernesto Bianco - 70 persons, dances
Sala Enrique Muino - 254 persons, scenic arts
Sala A/B - 750 persons
Sala C - 200 persons
Sala D - 200 persons
Sala E - 200 persons
Sala F - 200 persons
Salón Madres de Plaza de Mayo, 150 persons, for use of Madres de Plaza de Mayo, and others.

At the eastern end of the building there are two small parks– the Plaza de las Américas and the Patio de Esculturas.

References

External links

Art museums and galleries in Argentina
Theatres in Buenos Aires
Culture in Buenos Aires
Buildings and structures in Buenos Aires
Tourist attractions in Buenos Aires
Buildings and structures completed in 1970